In Greek mythology Smilax was the name of a nymph who was in love with Crocus and was turned into the plant bearing her name (the bindweed). Ancient sources with information about her and her tale are few and far in between.

Mythology 
Details of her story are vague and sparse. Pliny writes that Smilax was turned into bindweed shrub for loving the young Crocus. Ovid writes that the smilax and crocus both tell a love story, and Nonnus also mentions Crocus' love for Smilax, the "airgarlanded girl".

See also 
 Clytia, another nymph turned into plant out of unfulfilled love.
 Amaracus
 Myrsine

Notes

References 
 Publius Ovidius Naso, Metamorphoses translated by Brookes More (1859-1942). Boston, Cornhill Publishing Co. 1922. Online version at the Perseus Digital Library.
 Publius Ovidius Naso, Metamorphoses. Hugo Magnus. Gotha (Germany). Friedr. Andr. Perthes. 1892. Latin text available at the Perseus Digital Library.
 Pliny the Elder, Pliny – Natural History, 10 volumes. Translated by Rackham, H.; Jones, W. H. S.; Eichholz, D. E. Loeb Classical Library. 1938–1962.
 Nonnus of Panopolis, Dionysiaca translated by William Henry Denham Rouse (1863-1950), from the Loeb Classical Library, Cambridge, MA, Harvard University Press, 1940.  Online version at the Topos Text Project.
 Smith, William, Dictionary of Greek and Roman Biography and Mythology, London (1873). Online version at the Perseus Digital Library.

External links 
 FLOWER MYTHS from The Theoi Project

Nymphs
Metamorphoses characters
Metamorphoses into flowers in Greek mythology